In Major League Baseball, the Rookie of the Year Award is given annually to two outstanding rookie players, one each for the American League (AL) and National League (NL), as voted on by the Baseball Writers' Association of America (BBWAA). The award was established in 1940 by the Chicago chapter of the BBWAA, which selected an annual winner from 1940 through 1946. The award became national in 1947; Jackie Robinson, the Brooklyn Dodgers' second baseman, won the inaugural award. One award was presented for all of MLB in 1947 and 1948; since 1949, the honor has been given to one player each in the NL and AL. Originally, the award was known as the J. Louis Comiskey Memorial Award, named after the Chicago White Sox owner of the 1930s. The award was renamed the Jackie Robinson Award in July 1987, 40 years after Robinson broke the baseball color line.

Seventeen players have been elected to the National Baseball Hall of Fame—Robinson, six AL players, and ten others from the NL. The award has been shared twice: once by Butch Metzger and Pat Zachry of the NL in 1976; and once by John Castino and Alfredo Griffin of the AL in 1979. Members of the Brooklyn and Los Angeles Dodgers have won the most awards of any franchise (with 18), twice the total of the New York Yankees, and members of the Philadelphia and Oakland Athletics (eight), who have produced the most in the AL. Fred Lynn and Ichiro Suzuki are the only two players who have been named Rookie of the Year and Most Valuable Player in the same year, and Fernando Valenzuela is the only player to have won Rookie of the Year and the Cy Young Award in the same year. Sam Jethroe is the oldest player to have won the award, at age 32, 33 days older than 2000 winner Kazuhiro Sasaki (also 32). Julio Rodríguez of the Seattle Mariners and Michael Harris II of the Atlanta Braves are the most recent winners.

Qualifications and voting

From 1947 through 1956, each BBWAA voter used discretion as to who qualified as a rookie. In 1957, the term was first defined as someone with fewer than 75 at-bats or 45 innings pitched in any previous Major League season. This guideline was later amended to 90 at-bats, 45 innings pitched, or 45 days on a Major League roster before September 1 of the previous year. The current standard of 130 at-bats, 50 innings pitched or 45 days on the active roster of a Major League club (excluding time in military service or on the injury list) before September 1 was adopted in 1971.

Since 1980, each voter names three rookies: a first-place choice is given five points, a second-place choice three points, and a third-place choice one point. The award goes to the player who receives the most overall points. Edinson Vólquez received three second-place votes in 2008 balloting despite no longer being a rookie under the award's definition.

The award has drawn criticism in recent years because several players with experience in Nippon Professional Baseball (NPB) have won the award, such as Hideo Nomo in 1995, Kazuhiro Sasaki in 2000, Ichiro Suzuki in 2001, and Shohei Ohtani in 2018. The current definition of rookie status for the award is based only on Major League experience, but some feel that past NPB players are not true rookies because of their past professional experience.  Others, however, believe it should make no difference since the first recipient and the award's namesake played for the Negro leagues before his MLB career and thus could also not be considered a "true rookie". This issue arose in 2003 when Hideki Matsui narrowly lost the AL award to Ángel Berroa. Jim Souhan of the Minneapolis Star Tribune said he did not see Matsui as a rookie in 2003 because "it would be an insult to the Japanese league to pretend that experience didn't count." The Japan Times ran a story in 2007 on the labeling of Daisuke Matsuzaka, Kei Igawa, and Hideki Okajima as rookies, saying "[t]hese guys aren't rookies." Past winners such as Jackie Robinson, Don Newcombe, and Sam Jethroe had professional experience in the Negro leagues.

Winners

Key

Major Leagues combined (1947–48)

American League winners (1949–present)

National League winners (1949–present)

Wins by team
Only the Arizona Diamondbacks have never had a player win the Rookie of the Year Award. The Brooklyn/Los Angeles Dodgers have won more than any other team with 18.

See also

Esurance MLB Awards Best Rookie (in MLB)
Players Choice Awards Outstanding Rookie (in each league)
Baseball America Rookie of the Year (in MLB)
Sporting News Rookie of the Year Award (in each league)
Rookie of the Month
Topps All-Star Rookie Teams
Baseball awards
Rookie of the Year (award) (all sports)

References
General

Inline citations

 
Rookie of the Year
Awards established in 1947
1947 establishments in the United States